BQT may be an acronym, code, or abbreviation for:

IATA airport code for the Brest, Belarus airport
SIL code for Bamukumbit language, a language of Cameroon
Bouquet